Hjärnarp is a locality situated in Ängelholm Municipality, Skåne County, Sweden with 975 inhabitants in 2010.

References 

Populated places in Ängelholm Municipality
Populated places in Skåne County